El Manso is a village and municipality in Río Negro Province in Valle El Manso in Argentina. Located in the vicinity of Chile El Manso was settled in the late 19th century by Chileans of mestizo and Mapuche stock as well by European immigrants. Chiloé Archipelago in particular was the place of origin of most Chilean settlers. Early settlers engaged in subsistence farming.

Climate

References

Populated places in Río Negro Province